Rockledge  may refer to:
 Rockledge, Florida, United States
 Rockledge, Georgia, an unincorporated community
 Rockledge Drive Residential District, a historic district on the National Register of Historic Places in Rockledge, Florida
 Rockledge, Pennsylvania, United States
 Rockledge, name of the chapter house of Alpha Sigma Phi fraternity at Cornell University
 Rockledge (Louisville, Kentucky), a building on the National Register of Historic Places
 Rockledge (Hagerstown, Maryland), a building on the National Register of Historic Places
 Rockledge (Swanton, Vermont), a building on the National Register of Historic Places
 Rockledge (Occoquan, Virginia), a building on the National Register of Historic Places